Hans Eichinger is an Austrian bobsledder who competed in the early 1970s. He won two medals in the four-man event at the FIBT World Championships with a silver in 1973 and a bronze in 1974.

References
Bobsleigh four-man world championship medalists since 1930

Austrian male bobsledders
Living people
Year of birth missing (living people)